Fritter Glacier is a glacier between Mount Curtiss and Mount Jensen in the Gonville and Caius Range, Victoria Land, Antarctica. It flows east to Wilson Piedmont Glacier. It was named in association with Mount Curtiss after Captain C.T. Fritter, U.S. Navy, commander of the seaplane tender USS Curtiss in the Ross Sea during Operation Deep Freeze II, 1956–57.

References

Glaciers of Victoria Land
Scott Coast